Madarihat Assembly constituency is an assembly constituency in Alipurduar district in the Indian state of West Bengal. It is reserved for scheduled tribes.

Overview
As per orders of the Delimitation Commission, No. 14  Madarihat Assembly constituency (ST) covers Madarihat-Birpara community development block and Binnaguri and Sakoyajhora I gram panchayats of Dhupguri community development block.

Madarihat Assembly constituency (ST)  is part of No. 2  Alipurduars (Lok Sabha constituency) (ST).

Members of Legislative Assembly

Election results

2021
In the 2021 West Bengal Legislative Assembly election, Manoj Tigga of BJP defeated his nearest rival Rajesh Lakra of TMC.

2016

In the 2016 West Bengal Legislative Assembly election, Manoj Tigga of BJP defeated his nearest rival Padam Lama of TMC.

2011

In the 2011 West Bengal Legislative Assembly election, Kumari Kujur of RSP defeated her nearest rival Manoj Tigga of BJP.

1977-2006
In 2006 and 2001 state assembly elections, Kumari Kujur of RSP won the 14 Madarihat assembly seat (ST) defeating her nearest rivals Atul Suba of Congress and Narendra Nath Karjee of Trinamool Congress respectively. Contests in most years were multi cornered but only winners and runners are being mentioned. Sushil Kujur of RSP defeated Pushpa Rani Lily Kindo of Congress in 1996, Tuna Toppo of Congress in 1991 and 1987, and Jagat Baria of Congress in 1982. A.H. Besterwitch of RSP defeated Dhirendra Narjinary of Congress in 1977.

1962–1972
A.H. Besterwitch of RSP won in 1972, 1971 and 1969. D.N.Rai of Congress won in 1967. A.H.Besterwich of RSP won in 1962.

References

Assembly constituencies of West Bengal
Politics of Alipurduar district